Stephen John Basil (April 2, 1893 – June 24, 1962) was an American Major League Baseball umpire who worked in the American League from 1936 to 1942. Basil umpired in two World Series (1937 and 1940) and in two All-Star Games (1938 and 1940). In his career, he umpired 1,037 Major League games.

References

External links
 The Sporting News Umpire Card

1893 births
1962 deaths
Major League Baseball umpires
Sportspeople from Texas